Sphegina limbipennis is a species of hoverfly.

Distribution
Spain.

References

Eristalinae
Diptera of Europe
Insects described in 1909
Taxa named by Gabriel Strobl